Iamphorina or Iamphorynna was the capital of the Maedi, a Thracian tribe in ancient Macedonia. It was taken by Philip V of Macedon in 211 BCE. Writing in the 19th century, William Martin Leake placed it at Ivorina (Vrania), in the upper valley of the Morava River. Modern scholars treat it as unlocated. Stephanus of Byzantium, citing Diodorus, has the name as Phorunna or Phorounna.

References

Populated places in ancient Macedonia
Former populated places in the Balkans
Thracian towns
Lost ancient cities and towns